Pinogana is a corregimiento in Pinogana District, Darién Province, Panama with a population of 405 as of 2010. Its population as of 1990 was 489; its population as of 2000 was 356.  It is located along the Tuira River.(30 April 2008). Panama: Weary repatriation, Relief Web

References

Corregimientos of Darién Province